A három sárkány is a Hungarian play, written by Sándor Hunyady. It was first produced in 1935.

References

Hungarian plays
1935 plays